Giovan Battista Pichierri (12 February 1943 – 26 July 2017) was an Italian prelate of the Roman Catholic Church.

Ordained to the priesthood in 1967, Pichierri served as bishop of the Diocese of Cerignola-Ascoli Satriano, Italy from 1990 to 1999. He then served as archbishop of the Archdiocese of Trani-Barletta-Bisceglie from 1999 until his death in 2017.

Notes

1943 births
2017 deaths
Italian Roman Catholic archbishops
People from the Province of Taranto